General Cabell may refer to:

Charles P. Cabell (1903–1971), U.S. Air Force general
DeRosey Caroll Cabell (1861–1924), U.S. Army major general
William Lewis Cabell (1827–1911), Confederate States Army brigadier general